George Underdown (12 May 1859 – 29 May 1895) was an English cricketer.  He made his first-class debut playing for the United XI against the touring Australians at Priory Park Ground in Chichester, Sussex. The United XI featured the great W.G. Grace.

Thereafter Underdown represented Hampshire in nine first-class matches from 1883 until 1885, the year which was to be the club's final season with first-class status until the 1895 County Championship. Underdown's highest score of 63 came against the Somerset during a county match in 1882. Underdown took his only wicket in first-class cricket in 1885 against the Marylebone Cricket Club. His final appearance for Hampshire came at the end of the 1885 season against Derbyshire.

Underdown died in Petersfield, Hampshire on 29 May 1895 at the young age of 36.

External links
George Underdown at Cricinfo
George Underdown at CricketArchive

1859 births
1895 deaths
People from Petersfield
English cricketers
Hampshire cricketers